From Mediterranea with Love is a Duran Duran 3-track EP, released as a download on iTunes for several European countries on 23 December 2010.

The EP includes the title track "Mediterranea", produced by Mark Ronson during sessions for the All You Need Is Now album in 2010. Released near Christmas, the EP also includes two live recordings and artwork based on images created by Clunie Reid with graphic design by Pop magazine. The EP was made available as a free download on iTunes for one day only in December 2010.

While a previously unreleased track at the time the EP came out, "Mediterranea" was later included in an expanded version of All You Need Is Now in March 2011.

Track listing
"Mediterranea"
"(Reach Up For The) Sunrise" (live)
"Ordinary World" (live)

Personnel
Duran Duran are:

 Simon Le Bon – vocals
 John Taylor – bass
 Nick Rhodes – keyboards
 Roger Taylor – drums

With:
 Dominic Brown – guitar

References

Duran Duran albums
2010 albums